Umiat (OO-mee-yat) is an unincorporated community in North Slope Borough, Alaska, United States. It is located on the Colville River, 140 miles southwest of Deadhorse in the Arctic Circle. The town is not accessible by road or rail, only by air or river.

History
In 1944, the Naval Oil Reserve was set up and it later became an air force base, which is now closed. 

In 1946, the Umiat oil pool was discovered in an anticlinal trap and estimated to hold more than 70 MMBO oil, but was never produced.

In 2009 Governor Parnell budgeted for a proposed road to Umiat branching off of the Dalton Highway.

Umiat has become a center in the summer for research by the BLM and USGS concerning climate change. Research also goes on in the impact that development has on the Arctic tundra. As the NPRA is managed by BLM, they watch the impact that the ice roads and ice-drilling pads have on  plant and animal life in the area.

Umiat has no permanent residents, being a camp and fuel stop for aircraft and helicopters operating in the area. The camp is run by a locally owned company that provides oilfield services in the area, their crew consists in the summer of approximately 10 people who work on a two weeks on two weeks off schedule. At any given time, there are between 20 and 30 people lodged and fed there.

The camp operates from the middle of May to the middle of September. The camp has access to the internet, news and entertainment by satellite.

Accommodations are "ATCO" units that are permanently placed; a cafeteria style kitchen is in one of the units.

Climate
Umiat has a subarctic climate with long winters. February is the coldest month, a common trait on the North Slope, and average temperatures remain below  until mid-April. Precipitation is irregular and snow has occurred in every month but July. Yearly low temperatures run even colder than Utqiaġvik, Alaska on average.

Transportation 
Umiat Airport is a state owned, public use airport located in Umiat.

References 

 
 

Unincorporated communities in North Slope Borough, Alaska
Unincorporated communities in Alaska